Ricardo Sanzol Goñi (born 8 April 1976 in Pamplona, Navarre) is a Spanish retired footballer who played as a goalkeeper.

References

External links

1976 births
Living people
Spanish footballers
Footballers from Pamplona
Association football goalkeepers
La Liga players
Segunda División players
Segunda División B players
CA Osasuna B players
CA Osasuna players
Albacete Balompié players
Hércules CF players
Basque Country international footballers